HD 16175 b is an extrasolar planet located approximately 195.6 light-years away in the constellation of Andromeda, orbiting the star HD 16175. This planet masses 4.8 times that of Jupiter. However, the mass is only a minimum since the inclination of the orbit is not known. This planet orbits at about 2.2 astronomical units, taking 2.73 years to revolve around the star. The orbit of the planet is highly noncircular with an eccentricity at 0.64.

The planet HD 16175 b is named Abol. The name was selected in the NameExoWorlds campaign by Ethiopia, during the 100th anniversary of the IAU. Abol is the first of three rounds of coffee in the Ethiopian traditional coffee ceremony.

Discovery
The discovery was made using radial velocity measurements taken between November 2004 and March 2009 with the Coudé Auxiliary and C. Donald Shane telescopes at Lick Observatory.

See also
 List of extrasolar planets

References

External links
 

Andromeda (constellation)
Giant planets in the habitable zone
Exoplanets discovered in 2009
Exoplanets detected by radial velocity
Exoplanets with proper names

de:HD 16175 b